The Longqing Emperor (4March 15375July 1572), personal name Zhu Zaiji (朱載坖), was the 13th Emperor of the Ming dynasty, reigned from 1567 to 1572. He was initially known as the Prince of Yu (裕王) from 1539 to 1567 before he became the emperor. His era name, "Longqing", means "great celebration".

Reign
After the death of the Jiajing Emperor, the Longqing Emperor inherited a country in disarray after years of mismanagement and corruption. Realizing the depth of chaos his father's long reign had caused, the Longqing Emperor set about reforming the government by re-employing talented officials previously banished by his father, such as Hai Rui. He also purged the government of corrupt officials namely Daoist priests whom the Jiajing Emperor had favoured in the hope of improving the situation in the empire. Furthermore, the Longqing Emperor restarted trade with other empires in Europe, Africa and other parts of Asia. Territorial security was reinforced through the appointment of several generals to patrol both land and sea borders. This included the fortification of seaports along the Zhejiang and Fujian coast to deter pirates, a constant nuisance during the Jiajing Emperor's reign. The Longqing Emperor also repulsed the Mongol army of Altan Khan, who had penetrated the Great Wall and reached as far as Beijing. A peace treaty to trade horses for silk was signed with the Mongols shortly thereafter.

The Longqing Emperor's reign, not unlike that of any previous Ming emperor, saw a heavy reliance on court eunuchs. One particular eunuch, Meng Cong (孟沖), who was introduced by the Longqing Emperor's chancellor Gao Gong, came to dominate the inner court towards the end of the emperor's reign. Despite initial hopeful beginnings, the Longqing Emperor quickly abandoned his duties as a ruler and set about pursuing personal enjoyment, much to the disappointment of the reform-minded advisors. The emperor also made contradictory decisions by re-employing Daoist priests that he himself had banned at the start of his reign.

In October 1567, Xu Jie firmly told the Emperor to stop eunuchs supervising the capital training divisions. Enraged, Longqing said "I ordered eunuchs to sit with the training divisions, and the speaking officials objected, and you all objected too. What's the idea? Explain your disobedience." Xu Jie explained that the Jiajing Emperor had abolished eunuch-run divisions and that the founder never set up eunuchs to run divisions. Longqing backed down for now.

Death

The Longqing Emperor died in 1572 and was only 35. Unfortunately, the country was still in decline due to corruption in the ruling class. Before the Longqing Emperor died, he had instructed minister Zhang Juzheng to oversee affairs of state and become the dedicated advisor to the Wanli Emperor who was only 10.

The Longqing Emperor was buried in Zhaoling (昭陵) of the Ming tombs.

Legacy

The Longqing Emperor's reign lasted a mere five years and was succeeded by his son. It was said that the emperor also suffered from speech impairment which caused him to stutter and stammer when speaking in public. He is generally considered one of the more liberal and open-minded emperors of the Ming dynasty, even though he lacked the talent keenly needed for rulership and he eventually became more interested in pursuing personal gratification rather than ruling itself.

Family

Consorts and Issue:
 Empress Xiaoyizhuang, of the Li clan (d. 1558)
 Zhu Yiyi, Crown Prince Xianhuai (15 October 1555 – 11 May 1559), first son
 Zhu Yiling, Prince Dao of Jing, second son
 Princess Penglai (1557), first daughter
 Empress Xiao'an, of the Chen clan (d. 1596)
 Princess Taihe (d. 1560), second daughter
 Empress Dowager Xiaoding, of the Li clan (1545 – 18 March 1614)
 Zhu Yijun, the Wanli Emperor (4 September 1563 – 18 August 1620), third son
 Princess Shouyang (1565–1590), personal name Yao’e, third daughter
 Married Hou Gongchen in 1581
 Princess Yongning (11 March 1567 – 22 July 1594), personal name Yaoying, fourth daughter
 Married Liang Bangrui (d. 9 May 1582) in 1582
 Zhu Yiliu, Prince Jian of Lu (3 March 1568 – 4 July 1614), fourth son
 Princess Rui'an (1569–1629), personal name Yaoyuan, fifth daughter
 Married Wan Wei (d. 1644) in 1585, and had issue (one son)
 Consort Duanjingshu, of the Qin clan
 Princess Qixia (1571–1572), personal name Yaolu, seventh daughter
 Consort Gonghuizhuang, of the Liu clan (d. 1582)
 Consort Zhuangxirong, of the Wang clan (d. 1580)
 Consort De, of the Li clan (d. 1632)
 Consort Duan, of the Dong clan
 Consort Hui, of the Ma clan
 Consort He, of the Zhao clan (d. 1581)
 Consort An, of the Yang clan (d. 1576)
 Consort Rong, of the Han clan (d. 11 September 1630)
 Consort Jing, of the Zhuang clan (d. 1580)
 Consort Zhaoronggong, of the Li clan
 Consort Yi, of the Yu clan
 Consort Qi, of the Ye clan (d. 1621)
 Consort Xian, of the Jiang clan
 Consort Gong, of the Wu clan
 Consort Jing, of the Qi clan
 Consort Ying, of the Xu clan
 Consort An, of the Qian clan
 Unknown
 Princess Yanqing (b. 1570), personal name Yaoji, sixth daughter
 Married Wang Bing in 1587

Ancestry

See also
 Chinese emperors family tree (late)

References

1537 births
1572 deaths
Ming dynasty emperors
16th-century Chinese monarchs
Chinese reformers